The Arab Ba'ath Progressive Party ( Ḥizb al-Baʿṯ al-ʿArabī t-Taqaddumī) is a political party in Jordan. It is the Jordanian regional branch of the Syrian-led Ba'ath Party. It was legally registered for the first time in 1993. The party is small, and has, according to a WikiLeaks document, "minuscule number of adherents". Despite it small size, the branch is able to get a decent footprint in Jordanian media through its leader, Fuad Dabbour. Dabbour's fiery statements on foreign policy are frequently quoted by the press. The party is less known than its pro-Iraqi counterpart, the Jordanian Arab Socialist Ba'ath Party. Fuad Dabbour is the branch's Regional Secretary. It is believed that the party has fewer than 200 members.

Political platform
The party's stated objectives are:
The struggle for the supremacy and institutionalization of democracy as well as the rule of law and constitution.
The removal of control of the people’s will and achievement of political and economic reform in the interest of the people.
Adherence to the monotheistic religions and respect of the national heritage and the Arab nation’s unity.
Consolidation of the democratic system and the achievement of Arab economic integration.

Regional Secretaries
Mahmood Ma′ayteh
Fuad Dabbour

See also
Jordanian Arab Socialist Ba'ath Party

References

External links
Facebook

1993 establishments in Jordan
Arab nationalism in Jordan
Ba'athist parties
Jordan
Political parties established in 1993
Political parties in Jordan
Socialist parties in Jordan